Shane O'Connor may refer to:

 Shane O'Connor (rugby union) (born 1983), Irish rugby union player
 Shane O'Connor (footballer) (born 1990), Irish footballer
 Shane O'Connor (darts player) (born 1985), Irish professional darts player
 Shane O'Connor (skier) (born 1973), Irish alpine skier
 Shane O'Connor (2004–2022), the son of Irish singer-songwriter Sinead O'Connor

See also
 Shayne O'Connor (born 1973), New Zealand professional cricketer
 Shane Connor (born 1959), Australian actor